A gunman fired with a Kalashnikov rifle on the United States embassy in Sarajevo on 28 October 2011, resulting in one local policeman guarding the embassy being wounded in the arm by the gunman, while the shooter was wounded by a police sniper. The attacker shot 105 bullets, and severely wounded policeman Mirsad Velić. A Ministry of Interior agent neutralized the attacker with a sniper shot. The attacker was identified as Mevlid Jašarević (b. 1988), bosniak who holds Serbian citizenship born in Novi Pazar in southwestern Serbia, living in well-known Wahhabist stronghold Gornja Maoča in Bosnia and Herzegovina. Jašarević lived in Vienna for a period before moving to Gornja Maoča.

On 24 April 2012, Mevlid Jašarević was indicted by a federal grand jury in the District of Columbia on charges of attempted murder and other violations in connection with his alleged machine gun attack on the United States Embassy, Sarajevo, on 28 October 2011. A Bosnian court sentenced him on 6 December 2012 to 18 years in prison. It was then lowered to 15 years in 2013.

On 23 November 2018, Bosnian police arrested the man who was believed to assist in 2011 attack in Sarajevo. Bosnian state prosecutor said the man was also suspected to have fought for Islamic State and Al-Nusra Front.

See also

 2015 Zvornik police station shooting

References

2011 crimes in Bosnia and Herzegovina
Attacks in Europe in 2011
October 2011 crimes
October 2011 events in Europe
2010s in Sarajevo
Terrorist incidents in Bosnia and Herzegovina
Islamic terrorism in Bosnia and Herzegovina
2011 mass shootings in Europe
Mass shootings in Bosnia and Herzegovina
Crime in Sarajevo
Attacks on diplomatic missions of the United States
Bosnia and Herzegovina–United States relations